"I'd Still Say Yes" is a hit single recorded by Klymaxx for the Constellation/MCA label. Written by Kenneth "Babyface" Edmonds, Greg Scelsa, and Joyce "Fenderella" Irby, and produced by Fenderella, it was released as the third single from their fifth album, Klymaxx, helping it reach gold status. The song featured backing vocals by R&B singer Howard Hewett. Reaching its peak at number seven on Billboard's Black Singles chart, and number 18 on the Billboard Hot 100, it was the group's last Hot 100 entry. "I'd Still Say Yes" also went to number eight on the Billboard Adult Contemporary chart.

Vocal credits
Lead vocal: Joyce Irby
Additional vocals:  Howard Hewett
Background vocals:  Klymaxx

Cover versions
The Braxtons covered the song on their album So Many Ways in 1996 and Demail Burks of “A Few Good Men” also provided his backing vocals. 
In 2002, Native Blend released their cover version on Flyin Hawaiian Records. 
In 2006, Jennylyn Mercado covered it on her album Letting Go.

References

1987 singles
Klymaxx songs
Songs written by Babyface (musician)
Contemporary R&B ballads
1986 songs
MCA Records singles
Songs written by Joyce Irby